"Hallelujah Day" is a song by Sweden-based musician and producer Dr. Alban, released in 1996 as the third single from his fourth studio album, Born in Africa (1996). It peaked at number 12 in Finland, number 30 in Sweden and number 35 in Austria.

Music video
The music video for "Hallelujah Day" was directed by Joakim Sandström.

Track listing

Charts

References

 

1996 singles
1996 songs
Dr. Alban songs
English-language Swedish songs
Songs written by Dr. Alban